St David's College is a private, boarding and day, middle and high school occupying Gloddaeth Hall in Llanrhos, Llandudno, north Wales. The school was founded by John Mayor in 1965 with the aim of offering a whole-person education based on Christian principles and outdoor education. The school also supports children and young adults with learning difficulties and has a whole-school approach to dyslexia with considerable emphasis on developing individual talents.

Buildings
It occupies an eclectic variety of buildings such as Gloddaeth Hall, centred on the Minstrel Hall dating from the Tudor period, right up to Chelsea/Augusta Houses and the Keith Lennard Technology Centre, which have all been built in the last few years.

Boarding houses
It has five boarding houses all situated on the campus grounds: 
Snowdon (Boys)
Tryfan  (Boys)
Cader   (Boys)
Augusta (Girls)
Hettie  (Junior)

Notable former pupils

 Cieren Fallon, jockey
 Jerry Moffatt, rock climber
 Edward Cadogan Viscount Chelsea.

References

External links
 School homepage
 Profile on the Independent Schools Council website
 BBC Archive Footage of School Opening

Boarding schools in Wales
Private schools in Conwy County Borough
Llandudno
Educational institutions established in 1965
1965 establishments in Wales